

2014 CAF Confederation Cup

Group stage

Group B

Note: Al Ahly's season end in beginning of July; the first half of the 2014 CAF Confederation Cup group stage matches were held in the previous season, as the competition was suspended by the beginning of June, as not to overlap with the 2014 FIFA World Cup

Semi-final

Final

In the final, the order of legs was decided by a draw, held after the group stage draw (29 April 2014, 11:00 UTC+2, at the CAF Headquarters in Cairo, Egypt).

2014 Egyptian Super Cup

2014-15 Egyptian Premier League

Position

Results

Results table

Match Details

2015 Egypt Cup

Round 32

Round 16

Quarter-final

Semi-final

Final

2015 CAF Super Cup

2015 CAF Champions League

Round 32

Al Ahly won 4–0 on aggregate and advanced to the second round.

Round 16

1–1 on aggregate. Moghreb Tétouan won the penalty shoot-out and advanced to the group stage. Al Ahly entered the Confederation Cup play-off round.

2015 CAF Confederation Cup

Play-off Round

3–3 on aggregate. Al Ahly won the penalty shoot-out and advanced to the group stage.

Group stage

Group A

References

Al Ahly SC seasons
Al-Ahly